Råde is a municipality in Viken county, Norway.  The administrative centre of the municipality is the village of Karlshus.  The parish of Raade was established as a municipality on 1 January 1838 (see formannskapsdistrikt).

The neighbouring municipalities are Rygge, Våler, Sarpsborg, and Fredrikstad.  There are four major villages in the municipality: Karlshus, Saltnes, Missingmyr, and Slangsvold.

General information

Name 
The municipality (originally the parish) is named after the old Råde farm (Old Norse: Róða), since the first church was built here. The name is identical with the word róða which means "bar, pole, or rod". Here it is referring to one of Norway's many terminal moraines, and the farm and the church named after it.  Prior to 1921, the name was written "Raade".

History
Traces of settlements from 3000 BC have been located at Vansjø.

Coat-of-arms 
The coat-of-arms is from modern times.  They were granted on 30 May 1980. The arms are canting for the name of the municipality.  It shows a yellow bend on a green background. The arms thus symbolise the moraine and glacial path from the Ice ages that runs through the municipality. The colour green symbolises the fertile soil.

Demography

Råde Church

Råde church (Råde kirke) is a medieval era church in Råde parish. The church belongs to Vestre Borgesyssel deanery in Diocese of Borg. The church dates from 1185 and is of Romanesque style. The edifice is of brick and stone and has 300 seats. The church has a rectangular nave and narrow choir with an apse which is semicircular.  The baptismal font is from the 1500s and the altarpiece is from  1638. The altarpiece was painted both in 1862 and 1918. In 1950–60, the altarpiece was restored. The church was extensively repaired in 1860–1862. In the late 1950s, restoration work initiated.

Climate 
Climate data is supplied by Rygge meteorological station by the airport, located right on the border between Rygge and Råde.

Culture
Helleristning [ petroglyphs ] from the Bronze Age have been found in Råde.

Notable people 
 Johannes Gerckens Bassøe (born 1878 in Råde – 1962) a Norwegian jurist and civil servant who was the first Governor of Svalbard
 Egil Hovland (born 1924 in Råde – 2013) a Norwegian composer who wrote in diverse styles
 Hermund Nygård (born 1979 in Råde) a Norwegian jazz drummer
 Vidar Martinsen (born 1982 in Råde) a Norwegian footballer with over 250 club caps

References

External links 
 
 
 Municipal fact sheet from Statistics Norway
 

 
Municipalities of Østfold
Municipalities of Viken (county)